Bob Marshall may refer to:

Politicians
 Bob Marshall (California politician) (1934–2012), mayor of San Bruno, California
 Bob Marshall (Kansas politician), Republican member of the Kansas Senate
 Bob Marshall (Virginia politician) (born 1944), Republican member of the Virginia House of Delegates

Others
 Bob Marshall (billiards player) (1910–2004), Australian and world billiards champion
 Bob Marshall (wilderness activist) (1901–1939), American forester, writer and wilderness activist
 Bob Marshall (footballer) (born 1940), former Australian rules footballer who played with South Melbourne in the Victorian Football League
 Bob Marshall (Canadian football) (1923–1992), Canadian football player
 Bob Marshall, bassist with John Miles

See also
 Bob Marshall-Andrews (born 1944), British MP
 Bobby Marshall (disambiguation)
 Robert Marshall (disambiguation)
 Bob Marshall Wilderness, a congressionally designated wilderness area in Western Montana, named for Bob Marshall (wilderness activist)
 Bob Marshall Wilderness Complex, three wilderness areas in the state of Montana